Christos FC is an American soccer team based in Baltimore, Maryland, that competes in the Maryland Major Soccer League, an affiliated league of United States Adult Soccer Association.

History 
Founded in 1997, the team is composed of ex-professionals and local college players in the Greater Baltimore area. The team colors are green, gold and black. The team takes its name from Christos Discount Liquors.

The club received national recognition for advancing past fourth-division sides Fredericksburg FC and Chicago FC United and the second-division side Richmond Kickers in the 2017 Lamar Hunt U.S. Open Cup. The team reached the fourth round, before they lost to Major League Soccer's D.C. United. Christos opened the scoring, which received national attention.

The team qualified again in 2018, losing in the first round to Reading United AC in a penalty kick shootout, and in 2020.

In November 2018, the team launched a partnership with FC Baltimore of the National Premier Soccer League. The two teams began to share resources while the newly named "FC Baltimore Christos" continued to compete in the NPSL.

In April 2021, it was announced that the team would join USL League Two for the 2022 season.

The club is also two-time Werner Fricker National Open Cup champions (2016, 2018) and won the USASA National Amateur Cup in 2016.

Year-by-year

Roster

Club honors 
USASA National Amateur Cup (1): Champions 2016
USASA Werner Fricker National Open Cup (2): Champions 2016, 2018
Lamar Hunt U.S. Open Cup 4th Round 2017
Lamar Hunt U.S. Open Cup 1st Round 2018
USASA Over-30 Gerhard Mengel National Cup (3): Champions 2012, 2013, 2014
USASA U-23 National Champions (1): Champions 2002
Maryland Major Soccer League (7): Champions 1997, 2001, 2003, 2007*, 2015, 2016, 2017, 2018
United States Adult Soccer Association

References

External links 
 

Association football clubs established in 1997
Soccer clubs in Maryland
Sports teams in Baltimore
1997 establishments in Maryland
Works soccer clubs in the United States